is a Japanese football player. He is currently contracted to J3 League side Grulla Morioka having previously played for Gamba Osaka.<

Career statistics
Last update: 3 December 2017.

Reserves performance

References

External links
Profile at Grulla Morioka

1996 births
Living people
Association football people from Osaka Prefecture
People from Sakai, Osaka
Japanese footballers
J1 League players
J3 League players
Gamba Osaka players
Gamba Osaka U-23 players
Iwate Grulla Morioka players
Association football defenders
Association football midfielders